The 2020 Arkansas Republican presidential primary took place on Super Tuesday, March 3, 2020. It used the "Winner takes most" system of allocating delegates. This system states that a candidate must receive 15% of the vote to receive any delegates statewide or by congressional district, but only if the winner gets less than 50% of the aggregate vote. Should they do so, it becomes winner-take-all.

Results
The following candidates are on the ballot.

See also
 2020 Arkansas Democratic presidential primary

References

Arkansas
Arkansas Republican primaries